Ross Tomaselli (born January 9, 1992 in Wilmington, North Carolina) is a former American soccer player.

Career

College and amateur
Tomaselli played four years of college soccer at Wake Forest University between 2010 and 2013.

Professional
Tomaselli went undrafted in the 2014 MLS SuperDraft and later signed with his hometown club Wilmington Hammerheads of the USL Pro.

After two seasons with Wilmington, Tomaselli signed with new United Soccer League side FC Cincinnati ahead of their inaugural 2016 season.

Post career 
Since 2017, Tomaselli has been a Media Developer with Morvil Advertising + Design Group in his native Wilmington, North Carolina.

Following his playing career, Tomaselli became an advocate to fight cancer and raised awareness for the Memorial Sloan Kettering Cancer Center by running in the 2018 New York City Marathon.

Personal life 
Tomaselli has express support to Colin Kaepernick and the kneeling of the national anthem.

References

External links
 
 Wake Forest bio

1992 births
Living people
American advertising people
American graphic designers
American soccer players
Association football midfielders
FC Cincinnati (2016–18) players
Soccer players from North Carolina
Sportspeople from Wilmington, North Carolina
Wake Forest Demon Deacons men's soccer players
Wilmington Hammerheads FC players
USL Championship players